Matthew Halsall is an English, Manchester-based jazz musician, composer, producer and founder of the independent jazz label Gondwana Records.

Biography
Halsall's first album was Sending My Love in 2008, that was also the first release of his label Gondwana Records, followed by Colour Yes in 2009. Success came with his third album On the Go in 2011, awarded the Gilles Peterson Worldwide Winners Award, and nominated as best jazz act in the 2011 MOBO Awards.

In 2012 the fourth album Fletcher Moss Park was released, and in 2014 he released his fifth album When the World Was One with the eight-member group Gondwana Orchestra. This album was awarded iTunes Jazz Album of the Year 2014.

In 2015 Into Forever, and a remix of On the Go in 2016, were released. In 2019 he released Oneness.

2020's Salute To The Sun marks the debut of his new band, with young musicians from Manchester. The album draws inspiration from themes of ecology, the environment and harmony with nature.

Music style
Halsall's music is inspired by the spiritual jazz of Alice Coltrane, Pharoah Sanders and Miles Davis, with trip hop influences following in the footsteps of The Cinematic Orchestra.

Discography

Albums

Solo
 Sending My Love (2008)
 Colour Yes (2009)
 On the Go (2011)
 Fletcher Moss Park (2012)
 Oneness (2019)
 Salute To The Sun (2020)

Matthew Halsall & The Gondwana Orchestra
 When the World Was One (2014)
 Into Forever (2015)

Singles
 "Journey in Satchidananda" / "Blue Nile" (2015)

References

External links 
 
 
 
 

Living people
Year of birth missing (living people)
English jazz trumpeters